Kim Kum-chol (born 7 April 1997) is a North Korean footballer who currently plays as a defender for Rimyongsu.

Career statistics

International

References

External links
 
Kim Kum-chol at DPRKFootball

1997 births
Living people
North Korean footballers
North Korea international footballers
North Korea youth international footballers
Association football defenders
Rimyongsu Sports Club players
Footballers at the 2018 Asian Games